Ayoka is a feminine given name commonly used in Nigeria and derived from the Yoruba language. It means "one who causes joy" or "one who causes joy all around".

Notable Ayokas
Ayoka Chenzira, filmmaker and television director
Ayoka Olufunmilayo Adebambo, professor of animal breeding and genetics
Ayoka Wiles, philanthropist, arts and culture strategist, researcher

References 

Yoruba given names
African feminine given names